Aemilia Tertia, also known as Aemilia Paulla (c. 230–163 or 162 BC), was the wife of the Roman consul and censor Scipio Africanus.  She was the daughter, possibly the third surviving daughter, of the consul Lucius Aemilius Paullus and the sister of the consul Lucius Aemilius Paullus Macedonicus.

Family background
Aemilia belonged to the patrician gens Aemilia, one of the most famous families of the Roman Republic. Roman women of the Middle Republic customarily bore their father's family name and were sometimes distinguished by their birth order. As with men named Quintus ("the Fifth") or Sextus ("the Sixth"), a name such as Tertia may not always mean a woman had two older sisters. Valerius Maximus gives her name as Tertia Aemilia, "the wife of Scipio Africanus and the mother of Cornelia." Aemilia is not known to have had sisters.

Aemilia Tertia's marriage to Scipio Africanus took place no later than 215 BC. They were very happily married, according to Livy, Polybius, and other classical historians.

Character of Aemilia
Aemilia was gentle, mild-mannered, but also fiercely loyal to her husband who upset many senators by challenging the older leaders in their military strategy, and conservative Romans by his adoption of some parts of Greek lifestyle. The Greek historian Polybius who was living in the household of her brother Lucius Aemilius Paullus Macedonicus for some time, and who almost certainly was an eye-witness, wrote of Aemilia Tertia:  
"This lady whose name was Aemilia, used to display great magnificence whenever she left her house to take part in the ceremonies that women attend, having participated in the fortune of Scipio when he was at the height of his prosperity. .. For apart from the richness of her own dress and of the decorations of her carriage, all the baskets, cups, and other utensils for the sacrifice were either of gold or silver, and were borne in her train on all such solemn occasions, .. while the number of maids and men-servants in attendance was correspondingly large. (Polybius, translated by John Dryden, Book 31 Fragments: 26)
This passage shows that for that period, the last decades of the Middle Republic, Aemilia Tertia had unusual freedom and wealth for a patrician married woman, both given her by an unusually liberal husband.  She is one of the few Roman women known to us from the Middle Republic.  Because of her unusual wealth and freedom, and her own behavior, she was an important role model for many younger Roman woman, just as her youngest daughter Cornelia (190-121 BC), would be an important role model for many Late Republican Roman noblewomen, including allegedly, Aurelia Cotta, the mother of Julius Caesar.
 
Valerius Maximus relates an incident where Scipio was unfaithful to her with one of their own maid-servants, but Aemilia chose not to make the matter public. Valerius Maximus and Plutarch would have considered such behavior as honorable for Scipio, who after all, was not debauching his own wife.  Marital sex was considered to be essentially procreative among Middle-Republic Romans.  The year of this incident was around 191 BC or later, at which time Aemilia was either pregnant with her youngest child or had given birth recently.  The fact that Aemilia chose not to expose her husband's infidelity (per Valerius Maximus)  could indicate either a desire to spare him embarrassment or her own desire to avoid embarrassment for herself.  A Roman wife could not expect her husband to be faithful, and his misconduct whether at home or outside was not grounds for a divorce.  Furthermore, by divorcing her husband (or rather, being divorced in that period), a woman lost custody of her children and usually had to return to her father's or brother's house.  The husband could retain most of her dowry, so Aemilia could get as little as one-fifth of her dowry back.  Aemilia's sister-in-law Papiria Masonis was divorced c. 183 BC by her husband, simply because he was tired of her.  She was entirely blameless, having provided him with two sons and two daughters, and her chastity was not in question.  After her divorce, she lived in rather straitened circumstances, and without her children who remained with their father and paterfamilias.

Sources such as Polybius also emphasize her love of luxury and her extravagance; she drove a special chariot at women's religious processions and was attended by a large number of servants.  One source claims that she enjoyed buying tasteful although extravagant works of art.

Scipio's death and aftermath
Scipio died of a lingering illness in 183 BC after having retired to his country house at Liternum in 185 BC.  He was survived by his widow and four children; his brother Scipio Asiaticus also remained living, although in political disgrace.

According to Polybius, Scipio made generous provisions for his widow to ensure that she would retain the same lifestyle she had grown accustomed to as his wife. He also promised his daughters fifty talents of silver each, which was a very large dowry by that era's standards.

Aemilia as a widow
Aemilia Tertia long survived her husband and outlived both her sons. She had two daughters surviving upon her own death, which took place sometime around 163 BC and by 162 BC.

Bearing no grudge against the maid-servant with whom her husband had an affair, Aemilia freed her and gave her in marriage to one of her freedmen.

She continued her luxurious lifestyle despite widowhood, presumably having been guaranteed a generous income by her husband's will. However, due to the lex Voconia (which prohibited women from inheriting much or from passing on their own wealth to other women) passed in 169 BC, she was unable to dispose of her possessions as she pleased.  At her death, her wealth was inherited by her nephew Scipio Aemilianus, who had been adopted by the elder son of her husband. He gave them to his mother Papiria Masonis, the first wife of his father Aemilius Paullus. At her death, he passed those same possessions over to his two biological sisters, the wives of Marcus Porcius Cato Licinianus and Quintus Aelius Tubero.

Children
Aemilia Tertia and Scipio Africanus had four surviving children, two sons and two daughters. 

The elder son Publius Cornelius Scipio was a noted historian, but as his health was poor he could not follow a political career.  He adopted his first cousin Publius Cornelius Scipio Aemilianus as heir. The younger son Lucius Cornelius Scipio became praetor in 174 BC.

Her two daughters married prominent politicians: the elder Cornelia married her cousin Publius Cornelius Scipio Nasica Corculum and the younger Cornelia became the wife of Tiberius Sempronius Gracchus, and the mother of the famous Gracchi brothers.

See also
Scipio Africanus
Women in Rome
Scipio-Paullus-Gracchus family tree

Notes

References

Primary sources
 Valerius Maximus, Factorum et dictorum memorabilium libri vi.7.1
Plutarch's Lives, Volume II of The Project Gutenberg EBook by Aubrey Stew

Secondary sources
Additional references to husband Scipio Africanus
 Friedrich Munzer, Roman Aristocratic Parties and Families (1920)
 T.R.S. Broughton, Magistrates of the Roman Republic (1950-1, 1986)
 

3rd-century BC Roman women
2nd-century BC Roman women
230s BC births
160s BC deaths
Aemilii